Beaufort High School is a public high school within the Beaufort County School District, located in Beaufort, South Carolina, United States, on Lady's Island. The school serves students in downtown areas of Beaufort and Port Royal in addition to students living on Lady's Island and St. Helena Island.

Academics
Beaufort High School is accredited by the Southern Association of Colleges and Schools.

In 2010, the "small schools" concept was adopted by Beaufort High School, in which learning academies were created to help foster students into their career paths. The school is split into four academies: Freshman Academy, International Studies, Arts, Communications, and Technologies, and Health Professions.  In 2011, the "Everyday Math" and "Everyday English" programs were set in place for incoming freshmen students who scored in the lower third of their middle school competency exams.

Athletics

Beaufort High competes at the Class AAAA level in the South Carolina High School League.  The school fields teams for boys in baseball, football, wrestling, basketball, swimming, cross country, track & field, tennis, and golf; and for girls in cheerleading, volleyball, basketball, swimming, cross country, track & field, tennis, softball and golf.

Beaufort's rival is cross-town Battery Creek High School, but due to the relegation of Battery Creek to Class AAA (as a result of declining enrollment and the opening of Whale Branch High School), the schools do not play each other at the same frequency as before.

Notable alumni
 Pat Conroy, best-selling novelist with many movies made from his books. Conroy has been both a student and teacher at Beaufort High
 Candice Glover, singer, American Idol season 12 winner
 Boyce Green, National Football League (NFL) running back, Cleveland Browns, Kansas City Chiefs
 Scott Mullen, Major League Baseball (MLB) player 
 Ron Parker, NFL player
 Devin Taylor, linebacker for the Detroit Lions 
 Asher Wojciechowski, professional baseball player

References

External links
 School website
 2015 school report card by S.C. Department of Education

Schools in Beaufort County, South Carolina
Public high schools in South Carolina
Buildings and structures in Beaufort, South Carolina